Sustainable Development Goal 15 (SDG 15 or Global Goal 15) is about "Life on land". One of the 17 Sustainable Development Goals established by the United Nations in 2015, the official wording is: "Protect, restore and promote sustainable use of terrestrial ecosystems, sustainably manage forests, combat desertification, and halt and reverse land degradation and halt biodiversity loss". The Goal has 12 targets to be achieved by 2030. Progress towards targets will be measured by 14 indicators.

The nine outcome targets include: Conserve and restore terrestrial and freshwater ecosystems; end deforestation and restore degraded forests; end desertification and restore degraded land; ensure conservation of mountain ecosystems, protect biodiversity and natural habitats; protect access to genetic resources and fair sharing of the benefits; eliminate poaching and trafficking of protected species; prevent invasive alien species on land and in water ecosystems; and integrate ecosystem and biodiversity in governmental planning. The three means of implementation targets include: Increase financial resources to conserve and sustainably use ecosystem and biodiversity; finance and incentivize sustainable forest management; combat global poaching and trafficking.

Humans depend on earth and the oceans to live. This goal aims at securing sustainable livelihoods that will be enjoyed for generations to come. The human diet is composed 80% of plant life, which makes agriculture a prime economic resource. Forests cover 30 percent of the Earth's surface, provide vital habitats for millions of species, and important sources for clean air and water, as well as being crucial for combating climate change.

An annual report is prepared by the Secretary-General of the United Nations evaluating the progress towards the Sustainable Development Goals. The proportion of forest area fell, from 31.9 per cent of total land area in 2000 to 31.2 per cent in 2020, representing a net loss of nearly 100 million ha of the world's forests. This was due to decreasing forest area decreased in Latin America, sub-Saharan Africa and South-Eastern Asia, driven by deforestation for agriculture. Desertification affects as much as one-sixth of the world's population, 70% of all drylands, and one-quarter of the total land area of the world. It also leads to spreading poverty and the degradation of billion hectares of cropland. A report in 2020 stated that globally, the species extinction risk has worsened by about 10 per cent over the past three decades.

Targets, indicators and progress 

The UN has defined 12 Targets and 14 Indicators for SDG 15. Five of them are to be achieved by the year 2020, two by the year 2030 and the rest have no target year.

Each of the targets also has one or more indicators to measure progress. In total there are fourteen indicators for SDG 15. FAO is the custodian agency for three of the indicators for SDG targets 15.1, 15.2 and 15.4.

Target 15.1: Conserve and restore terrestrial and freshwater ecosystems 
The full title of Target 15.1 is: "By 2020, ensure the conservation, restoration and sustainable use of terrestrial and inland freshwater ecosystems and their services, in particular forests, wetlands, mountains and drylands, in line with obligations under international agreements."

This target has two indicators: 
 Indicator 15.1.1: Forest area as a proportion of the total land area 
 Indicator 15.1.2: Proportion of important sites for terrestrial and freshwater biodiversity that are covered by protected areas, by ecosystem type

Forests cover roughly 4 billion hectares or 30.7 per cent of the world's land area. 93 percent are natural forests and 7 percent are planted. The forest area is defined by the land under natural or planted groups of trees of at least 5 meters in situ. The trees can be either be productive or non-productive and should not include fruit plantations and agroforestry systems and trees in urban parks and gardens. Protected areas are defined by three indicators: 1) the proportion of total terrestrial area classified as protected 2) the proportion of important sites of terrestrial biodiversity who are protected 3) and proportion of important sites of freshwater biodiversity that are protected.

A progress report in 2020 provided the following data for forest areas:
 The proportion of forest area fell, from 31.9 per cent of total land area in 2000 to 31.2 per cent in 2020, representing a net loss of nearly 100 million ha of the world's forests.
 From 2000 to 2020, forest area increased in Asia, Europe and Northern America.
 From 2000 to 2020, forest area decreased in Latin America, sub-Saharan Africa and South-Eastern Asia, driven by land conversion to agriculture. 

In 2020 it was found that the proportion of forests in protected areas and under long-term management plans, as well as certified forest area, increased or remained stable at the global level and in most regions of the world.

The United Nations General Assembly has defined Sustainable forest management as a dynamic and evolving concept that aims to maintain and enhance the economic, social and environmental values of all types of forests, for the benefit of present and future generations (Resolution A/RES/62/98). It aims to find a balance between the increasing demands for forest products and the benefits as well as preserving the health and diversity of the forests.

SDG indicator 15 is composed of five sub-indicators that measure progress towards all dimensions of sustainable forest management. They provide qualification to the management of forest areas and assess areas with a set on national and international standards.

Forests are affected by various direct or indirect driving factors, population, and the pursuit of food and other commodities, putting tremendous pressure on the land (Lobell et al. 2011).Findings in FAO's Forest Resources Assessment. The global forest coverage rate decreased by 3.1% from 1990 to 2015, and the rate of deforestation in tropical regions was relatively high, with an annual loss of 5-6 million hectares. Since 2001, tropical forest coverage has continued to decline, and 80% of tropical and subtropical deforestation is caused by agriculture (Kissinger et al. 2012) Latin America accounts for 70%, and Asia and Africa account for 30-35%. REDD+ (Reduce deforestation) And forest degradation emissions) are largely ignored and often excluded from forest activity strategies (Klaus, 2019). This omission is harmful because the loss of fauna has an impact on tropical forest ecosystems. Significant negative impacts, which in turn affect the biodiversity in these systems, and the many socio-economic and cultural impacts that affect human well-being.

Target 15.3: End desertification and restore degraded land 
The full title of Target 15.3 is: "By 2030, combat desertification, restore degraded land and soil, including land affected by desertification, drought and floods, and strive to achieve a land degradation-neutral world."

This target has one indicator: Indicator 15.3.1 is the "Proportion of land that is degraded over the total land area".

Desertification is defined by the degradation of drylands as a result of various factors, including climatic variations and human activities. Desertification can be prevented by integrating land and water management to protect soils from erosion and degradation, protecting the vegetations, integrating the use of land for farming among others. Desertification affects as much as one-sixth of the world's population, 70% of all drylands, and one-quarter of the total land area of the world. It also leads to spreading poverty and the degradation of billion hectares of cropland.

Target 15.4: Ensure conservation of mountain ecosystems 
The full title of Target 15.4 is: "By 2030, ensure the conservation of mountain ecosystems, including their biodiversity, in order to enhance their capacity to provide benefits that are essential for sustainable development."

This target has two indicators:
 Indicator 15.4.1: Coverage by protected areas of important sites for mountain biodiversity
 Indicator 15.4.2: Mountain Green Cover Index

The Mountain Green Cover Index measured the percentage of mountain environments covered by green areas and the capacity of those areas to fulfil their ecosystem roles.

As of 2017, 76% of the world's mountain areas were covered by green vegetation, including forests, shrubs, grassland and cropland. The Mountain Green Cover was lowest in Western Asia and Northern Africa (60%) and highest in Oceania (96%).

Target 15.5: Protect biodiversity and natural habitats 
The full title of Target 15.5 is: "Take urgent and significant action to reduce the degradation of natural habitats, halt the loss of biodiversity and, by 2020, protect and prevent the extinction of threatened species."

This target has one indicator: Indicator 15.5.1 is the "Red List Index".

The Red List Index (RLI) shows trends in overall extinction risk for species and is used by governments to track their progress towards targets for reducing biodiversity loss. If the RLI value is 1.0, it means that species are categorized as 'Least Concern'. They will be expected to go extinct in the near future. If the RLI value is 0, this means that the species have gone extinct.

Habitat loss, unsustainable hunting, the introduction of invasive species and other factors have led to the extinction of 322 terrestrial vertebrate since 1500. At the same time, the numbers of most living species have declined. According to a detailed assessment by the International Union for Conservation of Nature (IUCN), 24,307 species are now seriously threatened with extinction.

A report in 2020 stated that globally, the species extinction risk has worsened by about 10 per cent over the past three decades. The Red List Index is declining, from 0.82 in 1990 to 0.75 in 2015 to 0.73 in 2020.

A report in 2018 stated that "biodiversity must be mainstreamed across these sectors and spatial planning integrated accordingly." It also tackles the importance of taking care of land degradation and restoring them where possible.

An important goal in 2021 is for the world to agree on a new biodiversity framework at the 15th meeting of the Conference of Parties to the CBD in Kunming, China. Throughout 2020, UNEP advocates an ambitious and measurable framework that supports more, larger and better managed protected areas, agriculture and fisheries that actively promote biodiversity, an end to harmful subsidies, and a shift from destructive extraction resource to sustainable consumption and production patterns.

Target 15.5.A: Reduce urbanization 
Urbanization leads to land loss and affects natural ecosystems, and the impact of urbanization on biodiversity is more serious than other forms of human activities (Czech,et al.,2000).

Urbanization leads to light and noise pollution that affect the physiology, behavior and reproduction of many animals (Newport et al. 2014). Biodiversity considerations seem to be one of the least important factors.

A healthy and functional natural environment is essential to promote sustainable economic growth and is conducive to human health and happiness.

Target 15.6: Protect access to genetic resources and fair sharing of the benefits 
The full title of Target 15.6 is: "Promote fair and equitable sharing of the benefits arising from the utilization of genetic resources and promote appropriate access to such resources, as internationally agreed."

This target has one indicator: Indicator 15.6.1 is the "Number of countries that have adopted legislative, administrative and policy frameworks to ensure fair and equitable sharing of benefits".

This indicator is used to track countries' participation in protocols related to the promotion and sharing of genetic resources for plants, food and agriculture.

The Nagoya Protocol on "Access to Genetic Resources and the Fair and Equitable Sharing of Benefits Arising from their Utilization to the Convention on Biological Diversity" is an international agreement which aims to share the benefits arising from the utilization of genetic resources in a fair and equal way.

As of 2020, there are now 146 contracting parties to the International Treaty on Plant Genetic Resources for Food and Agriculture, and 56 countries have provided information about their access and benefit-sharing measures.

Target 15.7: Eliminate poaching and trafficking of protected species 
The full title of Target 15.7 is: "Take urgent action to end poaching and trafficking of protected species of flora and fauna and address both demand and supply of illegal wildlife products."

This target has one Indicator: Indicator 15.7.1 is the "Proportion of traded wildlife that was poached or illicitly trafficked".

In general, wildlife trade policies that incentivize sustainable use typically have more immediate positive effects on wildlife populations than outright trade bans.

No data is available for this indicator yet.

Target 15.8: Prevent invasive alien species on land and in water ecosystems 

The full title of Target 15.8 is: "By 2020, introduce measures to prevent the introduction and significantly reduce the impact of invasive alien species on land and water ecosystems and control or eradicate the priority species."

This target has one Indicator: Indicator is 15.8.1 is the "Proportion of countries adopting relevant national legislation and adequately resourcing the prevention or control of invasive alien species".

Poaching is defined by illegal hunting and capturing of wild animals. The world is facing an unprecedented spike in illegal wildlife trade. It is the largest direct threat to the future of many of the world's most threatened and vulnerable species.

Wildlife poaching and trafficking threaten biodiversity and ecosystems as well as local livelihoods, wellbeing and security. Trafficking is normally driven by organized crime, and made easy by corruption and weak governance. Trafficking is a cross-cutting issue. Hence, addressing SDG 15.7 also addresses many other SDGs.

Target 15.9: Integrate ecosystem and biodiversity in governmental planning 
The full title of Target 15.9 is: "By 2020, integrate ecosystem and biodiversity values into national and local planning, development processes, poverty reduction strategies and accounts."

Indicator is 15.9.1 is the "Progress towards national targets established in accordance with Aichi Biodiversity Target 2 of the Strategic Plan for Biodiversity 2011–2020".

"Aichi Biodiversity Target 2" addresses the underlying causes of biodiversity loss by mainstreaming biodiversity across government and society. The target is to have all biodiversity values integrated into national and local development by 2020 as well the incorporation of planning processes into national reporting systems.

As at January 2020, 129 parties, including the European Union, had reported their sixth national report. It was found that "about half the parties had made progress towards their targets, but not at a rate that will allow them to meet their goals".

Target 15.a: Increase financial resources to conserve and sustainably use ecosystem and biodiversity 

The full title of Target 15.a is: "Mobilize and significantly increase financial resources from all sources to conserve and sustainably use biodiversity and ecosystems."

This target has one Indicator: Indicator 15.a.1 is the "Official development assistance and public expenditure on conservation and sustainable use of biodiversity and ecosystems".

The official development assistance (ODA) is defined by "the flows to countries and territories on the Development Assistance Committee (DAC) list of ODA recipients and to multilateral institutions". Institutions can by official agencies, state and local governments. The transactions should mainly promote the economic development and welfare of developing countries.

The Organization for Economic Cooperation and Development (OECD) highlights the fact that biodiversity-related ODA may often target multiple objectives at the same time, such as climate change and gender equality.

Target 15.b: Finance and incentivize sustainable forest management 
The full title of Target 15.b is: "Mobilize significant resources from all sources and at all levels to finance sustainable forest management and provide adequate incentives to developing countries to advance such management, including for conservation and reforestation."

This target has one indicator: Indicator 15.b.1 is the "Official development assistance and public expenditure on conservation and sustainable use of biodiversity and ecosystems".

This target aims at mobilizing resources at all levels to finance sustainable forest management. The United Nations Strategic Plan for Forests 2017-2030 (UNSPF) presents a global framework for actions at all levels to sustainably manage forests and halt deforestation and forest degradation. Forests present essential ecosystem services like timber, food, fuel as well as soil and water conservation and clean air. They also contribute to climate change mitigation and conservation of biodiversity. When we sustainably manage forests, they become healthy and resilient and provide essential goods and services to everyone.

Target 15.c: Combat global poaching and trafficking 
The full title of Target 15.c is: "Enhance global support for efforts to combat poaching and trafficking of protected species, including by increasing the capacity of local communities to pursue sustainable livelihood opportunities."

This target has one indicator: Indicator 15.c.1 is the "Proportion of traded wildlife that was poached or illicitly trafficked".

The illegal trade and animal trafficking have grown significantly to become one of the world's largest black markets valued at tens of billions of dollars.

The challenges to combat global poaching and trafficking need to be addressed by enforcing laws and strengthening institutions.

Potential solutions and importance

Why SDG 15 is important 
The reason SDG 15 is so impactful to our environment is because it promotes conservation, as well as biodiversity sustainably. These two facets supports the health of an ecosystem, which is vital for providing food, water, as well as ecosystem services, such as climate regulation and recreation. These ecosystem services are closely related to biodiversity, and essential to the livelihoods and well-being of marginalized groups, such as rural and indigenous communities. About 1.6 billion of the world's population depend on forests for their livelihood, which includes more than 70 million Indigenous peoples.

SDG 15 also has a huge impact on sustainable development, which relies on the prosperity of land/forest ecosystems. 30% of the Earth's surface is covered by forests, all of which together home more than 80% of all the terrestrial species of animals and plants in the world. However, according to data released by the University of Maryland, the planet lost an area of tree cover larger than the United Kingdom in 2020, which includes more than 4.2 million hectares of primary tropical forests.

This catastrophic losses of forests due to deforestation results in a loss in biodiversity, and consequently, low crop yield. Considering deforestation accounts for about 15% of emissions worldwide enhancing desertification, decreased forest cover could/has resulted in an increase in global warming's effects on our climate, which would affect over 1 billion of the population in the world.

SDG 15 is vital to have its targets met, because protecting and restoring ecosystems, as well as the biodiversity they support, directly mitigates the effects of climate change, and provide greater resilience in the face of increasing human pressure, and increasing disasters in our world.

Custodian agencies 
The custodian agencies are responsible for data gathering and reporting on the indicators. They are:

 Indicator 15.1.1, 15.2.1 and 15.4.2: Food and Agriculture Organization (FAO)
 Indicator 15.1.2: United Nations Environmental Programme-World Conservation Monitoring Center (UNEP-WCMC) and United Nations Environmental Programme
 Indicator 15.3.1 and 15.4.1: United Nations Convention to Combat Desertification (UNCCD)
 Indicator 15.5.1 and 15.8.1: International Union for Conservation of Nature (IUCN)
 Indicator 15.6.1: Convention on Biological Diversity (CBD-Secretariat)
 Indicator 15.7.1 and 15.c.1: United Nations Office on Drugs and Crime, and Convention for International Trade in Endangered Species (CITIES)
 Indicator 15.9.1: Convention on Biological Diversity (CBD-Secretariat) and United Nations Environmental Programme (UNEP)
 Indicator 15.a.1, 15.6.1 and 15.b.1: Organization for Economic Cooperation and Development (OECD), United Nations Environmental Programme (UNEP) and World Bank (WB)

Monitoring and progress 
An annual report is prepared by the Secretary-General of the United Nations evaluating the progress towards the Sustainable Development Goals. According to the expert group meeting in preparation for the High-level Political Forum of 2018, progress on SDG 15 is related to actions rather than status. For example, there is progress on the numbers of protected areas but enough on the Red List numbers. The monitoring framework still needs to be linked to quality to obtain more meaningful results. It also needs more indicators in areas such as forest intactness, management effectiveness of protected areas, and meaningful integration of biodiversity into other processes.

The biggest constraints to achieving SDG 15 are the lack of political profile, and a lack of cohesive action. This, accompanied by the fragmented nature of efforts to stabilize the loss of nature and life and land, means it is crucial to understand the political relevance of SDG 15 and act accordingly. This will give a clear picture of the costs of achieving this goal.

For target 15.8, no progress has been made, but with the growth in the number of invasive species and their spread due to increased trade and transport, the rate of biological invasions are not slowing down anytime soon.

For target 15.9, progress has been made, but is not sufficient to meet the target. By January 2020, progress towards the national targets related to Aichi Biodiversity Target 2 was examined by 113 parties and about half of them made progress but at a slower pace, which would not allow them to achieve their targets by the end of 2020.

Challenges

Impacts of COVID-19 pandemic 
In FAO's 2020 report on the state of the world's forests, the degradation and loss of forests was mentioned as an underlying cause of the COVID-19 pandemic. It is a contributing factor to disrupting nature's balance and increasing the risk and exposure of people to animal-related diseases. COVID-19 is a proof that degraded habitats will continue to lead to more animal-human interactions, diversification of diseases, evolutionary processes because parasites spread easily from livestock to human beings. It is evident from the pandemic that wildlife trafficking is a great contributor to ecosystems disruptions and spread of infections.

In 2020, there was brief progress on SDGS 12–15 on sustainable production and consumption, climate action and biodiversity conservation, but these gains were quickly offset once restrictions were lifted.This applies to CO₂ emissions, which declined in major economies during lockdowns, but went quickly back to their pre-pandamic levels after restrictions were lifted. It is estimated that deforestation increased by 12% from 2019 to 2020, and plastic consumption and waste may also increase during pandemic.

Links with other SDGs 
The UN 17 sustainable development goals are inherently interconnected, most of the goals can be achieved only when others are also achieved. And achieving any individual goal tends to help the achievement of the other goals. SDG 15 aims to "protect, restore and promote the sustainable use of terrestrial ecosystems, sustainably manage forests, combat desertification, halt and reverse land degradation and halt biodiversity loss". Even though it is primarily an environmental goal, it is seen as contributing to the implementation of many other goals, particularly the issues of food production and livelihoods, which are closely linked.

The success in conserving biodiversity can help to achieve SDG 1. For example, when farms have more biodiverse, they are more resilient and productive, reducing poverty by increasing agricultural productivity. Biodiversity also provides basic resources and ecosystem services that directly support a range of economic activities such as agriculture, forestry, fisheries, and tourism. Similarly, SDG 2 is to eradicate hunger, and eradicating hunger largely depends on agricultural productivity. Growing food while maintaining biodiversity in agriculture, is a key component of achieving food security. In line with SDG 3, more biodiverse environments protect people from specific pathogens and pests that not only damage crops but also directly threaten human health. Protecting biological diversity, reducing pollution and controlling pests through natural rather than pesticide can also protect human health.

The impact of SDG 15 on gender equality (SDG 5) is also significant. In many parts of the world, women are farmers, especially poor women living in rural areas. They are the main labor force in growing crops, often depend on forests for fuel, fodder and food. Their limited ownership of the land reduces their ability to adapt to losses or decide how to use it. By protecting biodiversity and thus maintaining agricultural productivity, can also empower gender equality. When forest conditions and regeneration improve, women themselves will get a greater political voice. Indigenous women in Peru, for example, have turned to ancestral farming techniques in response to climate change with support from the UN Women Gender Fund. In addition to healthier crops and higher community incomes, the program promotes indigenous women's participation in public Spaces and decision-making.

For SDG 6 and SDG 7, the availability and quality of water from the functioning of ecosystems, especially forest ecological system. Protecting biodiversity, and maintaining the integrity of wetlands and forests play a huge role in the acquisition and replenishment of freshwater resources because natural ecosystems act as filters to clean water and protect it from diseases that can harm the animal or human health. Biodiversity, if managed properly, can allow the sustainable use of biological energy, this means that gaining energy from crops, for example, gaining methane from crop production waste, is a form of access to energy, rather than from fossil fuels, thereby reducing pollution, will exert positive effects on biodiversity conservation.SDG 15 has a direct link to SDG 8 includes high-yield agriculture and tourism, which attracts tourists through protected ecosystems and biodiverse environments, thereby enhancing economic returns. At the same time, the conservation and integrity of ecological zones, ecosystems, can play a huge role in protecting infrastructure (SDG 9). Such as protecting road networks, power lines, and other infrastructure in areas threatened by natural disasters. If biodiversity is destroyed, it negatively affects poor people, because their livelihoods depend heavily on ecosystems, thereby increasing inequality(SDG 10).

For urban development (SDG 11), modeling studies of urban temperatures in the coming decades suggest that in urban areas with a 10% reduction in green cover, urban temperatures could rise by 8.2 °C above current levels under high emissions scenarios. On the other hand, a 10% increase in urban green coverage could limit temperature increases to 1 °C. Maintaining biodiversity plays a vital role in helping to mitigate and adapt to climate change. Mangrove forests, for example, account for approximately 1% of carbon sequestration by the world's forests, but about 14% by the global ocean. Therefore, negative impacts on mangrove habitats can result in very high GHG emissions. The impact of land-based activities such as agriculture, land reclamation and urban development on ecosystems demonstrates the high degree of linkage between SDG 13, SDG 14 and SDG 15, and the importance of the overall management of all three.

References

External links 
 UN Sustainable Development Knowledge Platform – SDG 15
 “Global Goals” Campaign - SDG 15 
 SDG-Track.org - SDG 15
 UN SDG 15 in the US

Sustainable development
Sustainable Development Goals
United Nations documents